Muzeum Warszawskiej Pragi is a museum in Warsaw, Poland. It was established in 2006.  It is located in historic buildings at Targowa 50/52, one of which, Krzyżanowski's House is the oldest brick built house in the Praga suburb, dating back to the 18th century.

The museum is a branch of the Museum of Warsaw. Exhibits include a model of Praga in the 18th century, historic photographs and artefacts donated by local residents.

References

External links
 
 

Museums in Warsaw
Museums established in 2006
History museums in Poland